The Canute Service Station is a historic service station located along former U.S. Route 66 in Canute, Oklahoma. The service station was built in two sections; the western section opened in 1936 as a roadhouse, while the service station itself was added in 1939. The station was designed in the Pueblo Deco style, an architectural style which blended elements of the Art Deco and Pueblo Revival styles. The Pueblo Deco style was most popular in the Southwest, particularly among businesses on Route 66 looking to attract westbound travelers. The service station's Pueblo Deco elements include its stucco exterior, its castellated parapet decorated with tile diamonds, and its red tile roof.

The service station was added to the National Register of Historic Places on February 9, 1995.

References

External links

Pueblo Deco architecture
Buildings and structures in Washita County, Oklahoma
U.S. Route 66 in Oklahoma
Buildings and structures on U.S. Route 66
National Register of Historic Places in Washita County, Oklahoma
Gas stations on the National Register of Historic Places in Oklahoma
1936 establishments in Oklahoma